This is a list of football (soccer) players who have played for Manchester City Women's F.C. It includes players who have played at least one match for the club (starting or as a substitute) in a competitive match since Manchester City Women were transferred to the FA WSL for the 2014 season.

Player statistics

 Appearances and goals are for first-team competitive matches only, recorded from the point of the club playing their first game in the FA Women's Super League in 2014
 Current players are in bold
 Players are listed according to the date and minute of their first team debut for the club, ordered alphabetically where no other sorting is possible

External sources
 Soccerway
 Manchester City official website - Match reports
 BBC Sport - FA WSL match reports

References

 
Players
Manchester City F.C. players
Players
Association football player non-biographical articles